Solus Christi Brothers is a monastic community in the state of Wisconsin. The community is part of the autonomous Ukrainian Orthodox Church in America.

Ukrainian Orthodox monasticism and monastic spirituality can be summarized as the process of going from Gospel to life and from life to Gospel. Monastic life is particularly important in the life of the Eastern Christian Churches insofar as, according to Church discipline, Bishops are elected exclusively from among the celibate monastic clergy.

History 
Founded in the United States and incorporated in the State of Wisconsin in 1977 (and registered as a 501(c)(3) US federally tax-exempt organization), Solus Christi Brothers is governed by the Ukrainian monastic Rule of Manjava, the Admonitions of the Founder as well as general Canon Law and is a semi-eremitical community. Solus Christi Brothers was granted stavropegial status in 2004 by the Holy Synod of Bishops of the Ukrainian Orthodox Church in America and is directly under the authority of the Metropolitan Prime Bishop. Some of their monks, particularly those who are Bishops, seek to live a more fully eremitical life because of their need for spiritual strength and for discerning the will of the Holy Spirit in leading the Church, and their privacy is deeply respected and protected by other members of the monastic communities in which they live.

Monastic life 
The monks of Solus Christi, as members of a small local monastic community (skete), strive to live the Gospel by spreading the Gospel by word and example in their homes, at work and in their parishes. They strive to mirror the life of the early Apostolic Christian community and to live in perfect charity. In keeping with the ideals of early Ukrainian monasticism, each community is limited to four and no more than six monks and/or associates (Rule of Theodosius of Manjava). Particularly, in the twenty-first century economic constraints are favorable to monks living in smaller monastic communities, very often in homes identical to the homes of ordinary people, and sharing more with seculars living in their immediate proximity.

What is distinct about Solus Christi Brothers is that in addition to the vows of poverty, chastity and obedience, the monks take a fourth vow of unceasing prayer—to pray always and in every situation, and members may be either Orthodox or Greek Catholic, without renouncing obedience to one's own particular jurisdiction.

The fraternity is the privileged place for developing their sense of Church, their Christian monastic vocation and ministry. Associate members (seminarians, clergy and lay men) are also admitted to membership and profess private vows of poverty, chastity, obedience and unceasing prayer.

Community life 
Community life, along with its common prayer (daily celebration of the Divine Liturgy and the Horologion, that is, the Eastern form of what is known in the Western Church as the Divine Office), formation, and fellowship provides the spiritual nourishment needed to live as a Christian in the world.

Joining the order 
Candidates must be in good standing with the Church, be willing to accept that belonging to Solus Christi means a lifelong commitment to the monastic way of life, be at least 21 years of age and be proven to be of sound physical, psychological, spiritual and moral health.

Formation 
There are four stages in the formation process, namely:
Postulancy: 3–6 months (exploring the life of Solus Christi Brothers through discernment)
Novitiate: one year (looking at the process of living the life of the community)
Temporal Vows: three years - journeying with the fraternity to find out if God is calling you to live this way of life. (Times may be extended, but not shortened)
Perpetual Vows: taken for life after the period of temporal vows has been completed

Formation does not end with Initial Formation, but continues as on-going formation for the rest of one's life.

Seminarians 
Seminarians are formed through Solus Christi Seminary whose formation program is affiliated with our jurisdiction's major seminary, the International Seminary of Saint Basil, Quito, Ecuador. All seminarians are expected to complete a bachelor's degree in a discipline which would facilitate their earning a living so that they would not pose a burden on the parishes/parishioners for whom they will eventually minister as either priests or deacons. After completing their bachelor's degrees, seminarians may advance to theological studies and to diaconal and/or priestly formation.

Solus Christi Brothers currently has foundations (sketes) in the United States and in Ukraine.

See also 
Autonomous Ukrainian Orthodox Church in America
Ukrainian Orthodox Church
Ukrainian Orthodox Church of the USA

External links
Christi Brothers official site
Ukrainian Orthodox Church in America
Orthodox wiki Ukrainian Monasteries

Eastern Orthodox monasteries in the United States
Ukrainian-American history
Christian monasteries in the United States